This article is the discography of the British space rock band Spiritualized.

Albums

Studio albums

Live albums

Compilation albums

Singles

Music videos

References

Discographies of British artists
Rock music group discographies